Global Georgian Airways (ICAO: GGZ) was an international cargo carrier airline founded in 2004 and was based in Tbilisi International Airport. It ceased operations in 2009.

See also
 List of defunct airlines of Georgia

References

Cargo airlines
Defunct airlines of Georgia (country)
Airlines established in 2004
2004 establishments in Georgia (country)